Herman Abdullah (18 July 1950 – 27 February 2022) was an Indonesian politician. A member of Golkar, he served as mayor of Pekanbaru from 2001 to 2011. He died in Pekanbaru on 27 February 2022, at the age of 71.

References

1950 births
2022 deaths
20th-century Indonesian politicians
21st-century Indonesian politicians
Andalas University alumni
Golkar politicians
Mayors of places in Indonesia
Padjadjaran University alumni
People from Pekanbaru